A Zirkel (German for "circle", as in "circle of friends") is a monogram used in European student societies in countries such as Germany, Austria, Switzerland, Belgium, Hungary, Latvia, Estonia (Studentenverbindungen).



Look and meaning 
A Zirkel consists of intertwined lines, followed by an exclamation mark if the society is still active. The lines mostly show the first letters of the name of the 
Studentenverbindung and / or the letters v,c,f or e,f,v.

Examples:

Meaning of v-c-f:
 Vivant fratres coniuncti ("the conjunct brothers should live")  or
 Vivat circulus fratrum ("the circle of brothers should live") or
 Vivat, crescat, floreat ("live, grow, flourish").

Meaning of e-f-v:
 Ehre, Freiheit, Vaterland ("Honour, Liberty, Fatherland").

Usage 
The members of the Studentenverbindung use the Zirkel as sign on Couleur or other things e.g. beer glasses etc. If a member signs 
in affairs of its Studentenverbindung it places the Zirkel after its signature. This use is similar to the use of postnominals in 
Anglo-Saxon countries.

Examples:

References

Further reading

 Peter Krause: O alte Burschenherrlichkeit - Die Studenten und ihr Brauchtum, Graz, Wien, Köln 1979 (German), 
 Peter Krause: O alte Burschenherrlichkeit - Die Studenten und ihr Brauchtum, 5. verb. Auflage, Graz, Wien, Köln 1997 (German), 
 Paulgerhard Gladen: Gaudeamus igitur - Die studentischen Verbindungen einst und jetzt, Köln 2001 (German)  
 Edgar Hunger / Curt Meyer: Studentisches Brauchtum, Bonn, Stuttgart 1958 (German)

Student societies in Germany
Student culture